Eastpak is an American worldwide lifestyle brand founded in Boston, Massachusetts, specializing in the design, development, manufacturing and worldwide marketing and distribution of a range of products including bags, backpacks, travel gear and accessories. In 1952, the company began as Eastern Canvas Products USA, Inc., producing bags and packs for the U.S. military before focusing on the consumer market under the brand name Eastpak as of 1976. It is part of the VF Corporation brand portfolio.

History

Founding 
Eastpak was founded in 1952 by Monte Goldman as Eastern Canvas Products USA Inc. Early activities included manufacturing a line of duffel bags, backpacks, and safety equipment for the U.S. Army. However, the company's direction changed dramatically when Monte's son Mark Goldman joined the company in 1976. He transformed the company's retail product line into a consumer brand and launched the first line-up of bags and packs at a sportswear trade fair in Chicago in 1977. Norman Jacobs joined the company in 1980 and, with partner Mark Goldman, claimed a market-leading share of the U.S. college market on the East Coast throughout most of the 1980s and early 1990s.[1]

Brand evolution
In 1985, Eastpak introduced bright colors and prints to the bag collections. The company became the first bag brand to offer a lifetime product warranty (for legal reasons, the warranty is limited to 30 years). The evolution towards a bolder, more original style was also matched in the mid-1980s by increasingly provocative advertising campaigns featuring, e.g., the controversial comic-book character Andy Capp. Eastpak entered the luggage market in 1999 with the first wheeled trolley produced for the consumer market. V.F. Corporation acquired the brand in 2000, where it joined other brands such as JanSport, The North Face, Kipling, Lee, and Wrangler.[1]

International expansion
Eastpak's first export markets were in Asia, with early successes in Japan, Korea, Singapore, and the Philippines.

Eastpak was first introduced onto the European market in 1986 by the Frenchman Kostia Belkin. He met with Mark Goldman and Norman Jacobs in Boston, who convinced him to start distributing Eastpak products in Europe. Kostia then expanded distribution throughout France, then Switzerland, and other European countries from 1986 to 1995, soon followed by brands such as Airwalk or DCSHOES, which saw Eastpak tap different corners of the market. Thirty-five years later, although distributed worldwide, France is the largest market for the Eastpak brand.

Products
Eastpak’s product portfolio includes a wide range of shoulder bags, backpacks, duffel bags, travel gear and accessories. Available in a large range of styles, colors, prints, and fabrics.

Travel gear
Eastpak was also the first company to produce wheeled luggage for the consumer market.

Since then, the company has significantly expanded its range of travel gear ranging from uncomplicated, single-volume holdalls to two and even four-wheeled trolleys with single or dual compartments, in a range of sizes from strict carry-on to standard carry-on and larger. Most styles integrate other design features such as adjustable shoulder straps, organizer pouches, laptop and multimedia sleeves, expansion zips and straps, “add-a-bag” loops and security lock rings.

Projects

Designer collaborations
In 2004, Eastpak partnered with Belgian fashion designer Walter Van Beirendonck. Since then, Eastpak has produced collections in collaboration with renowned designers including Kris Van Assche, Christopher Shannon, Raf Simons and many others.

References

VF Corporation
Design companies established in 1952
Bags
Travel gear
American brands
Luggage brands
Luggage manufacturers
1952 establishments in Massachusetts
2000 mergers and acquisitions